The Northern Rhodesia Journal, often referred to simply as "NRJ", was produced between 1950 and 1965, by the Northern Rhodesian Government Printer, to record some of the early history of Northern Rhodesia.  It is one of the most important sources of historical information on Zambia before and during its colonial era, up to its independence from the United Kingdom.

Format
The Journal is quarto in size.

The first two volumes comprised six "Numbers" each, and the page numbering started with 1 for each Number. For the remaining four volumes (the first three of which also had six Numbers) the pages in each volume were numbered continuously, started with page 1 in Number 1 of each volume. The final volume (VI) had but three Numbers, the pages numbered continuously, started with page 1 in Number 1,  and, as it was produced after Independence, was titled The Zambia Northern Rhodesia Journal.

Purpose
From the "Editorial" of the first issue:-

The difficulty is to state in a succinct fashion what our policy really is. It is easy to classify journals with restricted outlooks such as those concerned only with anthropological or agricultural or natural history interests. We too shall deal with all those topics but generally speaking we hope to draw into our net a catch of such variety that it cannot be easily classified.

We hope to bring to the general reader glimpses of the past history of this country and to place on record the events that have made recent history ; we shall relate the memoirs of men who have helped to mould the shape of our lives here or of men who have interesting tales to tell ; we shall open our columns to those who want to discuss facets of the wealth of animal and plant life of the Territory ; we shall write on the vast and variegated native culture that impinges on us at all times ; and, in fact, we shall be glad to publish anything of Northern Rhodesian interest that we believe to be of permanent or of literary value.

Significance
The Journal had no cut-off dates; it covered ancient history right through to its "present day" (1965).  One period of significant history which is covered is often called the period of welfare colonialism because of the impact of the Colonial Development and Welfare Acts of 1940 and 1945. These Acts were products of the same impulses which drove the Beveridge Report and the creation of the Welfare State in Britain after the Second World War. The NRJ documents the remarkable results of the investments made under the provisions of the Acts in Northern Rhodesia, which added enhanced educational, health and agricultural development services to the settled peace and impartial rule of law that the Colonial Service provided and which was a fundamental reason for the popular support documented by historians among the African populations. It was the loss of that impartiality which was most bitterly regretted after independence, especially in Barotseland, which became the Western Province of Zambia, and which felt itself to be systematically discriminated against by the independent government.  The resentment still smoulders.

The current retreat from ideological 'development', not least because of the evidence of unintended bad consequences of 'development' aid, and the rediscovery of the importance of practical, grass-roots, value for money help, makes the case-evidence of contemporary journals like the NRJ especially valuable sources for organisations like Oxfam or the Department for International Development.

References

Northern Rhodesia
Mass media in Zambia
History of Zambia
African history journals
English-language journals
Publications established in 1950
Publications disestablished in 1965